Oncy-sur-École is a commune in the Essonne department in Île-de-France in northern France.

Inhabitants of Oncy-sur-École are known as Oncéens.

Painter Simon Mathurin Lantara was a native of the commune.

See also
Communes of the Essonne department

References

External links

Mayors of Essonne Association 

Communes of Essonne